Quannah Rose Chasinghorse-Potts (born c. 2002) is an Indigenous American model. She appeared on the 2020 Teen Vogue list of Top 21 under 21.

Career
Chasinghorse was interested in modeling and fashion from a young age but, due to the lack of indigenous representation she found in magazines and fashion shows, did not think it was feasible as a career. In 2020, she landed a gig with Calvin Klein for their one future #ckone youth campaign. She then signed with IMG Models. She has since featured on the covers of Vogue Mexico, Vogue Japan, V Magazine, Elle, and Porter. She became recognised for her traditional face tattoos called Yidįįłtoo.

Chasinghorse makes a point of celebrating indigenous fashion and promoting sustainable indigenous brands. Her red carpet look at the Gilded Age themed Met Gala in May 2022 went viral on social media. The Navajo-inspired outfit was put together by Peter Dundas, Tabitha Simmons, Gucci Westman, and 2006 Miss Navajo Nation Jocelyn Billy-Upshaw, a family friend. Refinery29 called her the "breakout star" of the event. That same week, she walked her first runway at New York Fashion Week.

Personal life
Born in the Navajo Nation in Tuba City, Arizona, Chasinghorse is Hän Gwich'in of Eagle Village, Alaska, on her mother's side and her biological father is Nathan Chasing Horse (Sicangu-Oglala Lakota from South Dakota). Chasinghorse spent her early childhood in Arizona, Mongolia, and New Mexico before returning to her maternal homelands in Alaska at the age of six. She was raised with her two brothers, hunting, fishing, dog mushing, and living a subsistence lifestyle by their single mother. She lived in Kenny Lake and then Fairbanks and she attended Effie Kokrine Charter School.

Chasinghorse is a fourth-generation land protector for the Arctic National Wildlife Refuge as part of the Alaska Wilderness League. She said she does not want future generations to have to keep fighting. At age 17, she sat on the International Gwich’in Youth Council, traveling to Washington, D.C., New York, and Colorado. She lobbied against oil leasing that would damage the refuge and supported HR 11-46, a bill that would permanently protect the land. She participated in climate rallies both locally and in Denver. She has spoken on climate action and indigenous rights at a number of events and panels.

References

External links

Living people
2002 births
21st-century Native Americans
Alaskan Athabaskan people
Alaska Native activists
American child activists
Brulé people
Gwich'in people
IMG Models models
Native American environmentalists
Native American female models
Oglala people
People from Fairbanks, Alaska
People from Rosebud Indian Reservation, South Dakota
People from Tuba City, Arizona
Youth climate activists
21st-century Native American women
American women environmentalists